Strangalia luteicornis is a species of flower longhorn in the family of beetles known as Cerambycidae. It is found in North America. It has been observed mating on Hydrangea arborescens and Saururus cernuus, with the female consuming pollen from the latter plant.

References

Further reading

External links

 

Lepturinae
Articles created by Qbugbot
Beetles described in 1775
Taxa named by Johan Christian Fabricius
Beetles of North America